The 2011 FedEx Cup Playoffs, the series of four golf tournaments that determined the season champion on the U.S.-based PGA Tour, began on August 25 and ended on September 25. It included the following four events:
The Barclays — Plainfield Country Club, Edison, New Jersey
Deutsche Bank Championship — TPC Boston, Norton, Massachusetts
BMW Championship — Cog Hill Golf & Country Club, Lemont, Illinois
Tour Championship — East Lake Golf Club, Atlanta, Georgia

Bill Haas won the FedEx Cup by winning the Tour Championship in a playoff.

These were the fifth FedEx Cup playoffs since their inception in 2007.

The point distributions can be seen here.

Regular season rankings

The Barclays
The Barclays was played August 25–28. Of the 125 players eligible to play in the event, two did not enter: Charl Schwartzel (ranked 21) and J. B. Holmes (66). The PGA Tour announced on Friday, August 26 that the event would be shortened to 54-holes due to the anticipated arrival of Hurricane Irene on Sunday, August 28. Of the 123 entrants, 72 made the second-round cut at 138 (−4).

Dustin Johnson won by two strokes over defending champion Matt Kuchar and moved to first place in the standings. The top 100 players in the points standings advanced to the Deutsche Bank Championship. This included eight players who were outside the top 100 prior to The Barclays: Camilo Villegas, Chris Stroud, Ian Poulter, Pádraig Harrington, Bill Lunde, William McGirt, John Merrick and Ernie Els.

Deutsche Bank Championship
The Deutsche Bank Championship was played September 2–5. Of the 100 players eligible to play in the event, one did not enter: J. B. Holmes. Of the 99 entrants, 78 made the second-round cut at one-over-par, 143

Webb Simpson won on the second hole of a sudden-death playoff over Chez Reavie. Simpson moved to first place in the standings. The top 70 players in the points standings advanced to the BMW Championship. This included eight players who were outside the top 70 prior to the Deutsche Bank Championship: Chez Reavie, Blake Adams, Chad Campbell, Andrés Romero, Johnson Wagner, Ernie Els, Geoff Ogilvy, and Chris Stroud.

BMW Championship
The BMW Championship was played September 15–18, after a one-week break. All 70 players eligible to play in the event did so. There was no cut.

The top 30 players in FedEx Cup points after this event advanced to the Tour Championship and also earned spots in the 2012 Masters Tournament, U.S. Open, and (British) Open Championship.

Justin Rose won the event by two strokes over John Senden and moved to third in the rankings. Three players who were outside the top 30 prior to the BMW Championship played their way into the Tour Championship: Justin Rose, John Senden, and Geoff Ogilvy.

With the FedEx Cup points reset after the BMW Championship, all 30 remaining players have at least a mathematical chance to secure the season crown, and any of the top five players can claim the FedEx Cup with a win in the Tour Championship.

Reset points
The points were reset after the BMW Championship.

Tour Championship
The Tour Championship was played September 22–25. All 30 golfers who qualified for the tournament played, and there was no cut. Bill Haas won the tournament, in a playoff over Hunter Mahan, and the FedEx Cup.

Final leaderboard

For the full list see here.

Table of qualifying players
Table key:

* First-time Playoffs participant

References

FedEx Cup
FedEx Cup Playoffs